No Democracy is the fifteenth studio album by Japanese pop rock band Glay, released on 2 October 2019.

The album's details were announced on 17 August 2019 and it references the new Reiwa era of Japan established with the ascension of Naruhito to the Chrysanthemum Throne, replacing his father Akihito and ending the Heisei era. According to guitarist and leader Takuro, the title alludes to the fact that democracy is yet to be established around the world due to issues such as war and religious conflicts.

The album's bonus material includes live footage of their Glay Live Tour 2019 -Survival- tour which revisited their sixth album Heavy Gauge.

It reached #2 at both the Billboard Japan Hot Albums chart and the Oricon weekly charts, staying on the latter for 17 weeks. In the end of the year, it reached #79 at the Billboard Japan Year End Top Albums Sales and #87 at Oricon's.

The song "Kōri no Tsubasa" was used in the Japanese dub of the 2019 film Wings Over Everest. "Hajimeri no Uta" was featured as the opening theme of the anime Ace of Diamond Act II. "Colors" became the theme song of the film adaptation of the Final Fantasy XIV: Dad of Light series.

Track listing

DVD and Blu-ray bonus tracks (Glay Live Tour 2019 -Survival-) 
 "JUST FINE"
 "Young oh! oh!"
 "HEAVY GAUGE"
 "FATSOUNDS"
 "SURVIVAL"
 "ここではない、どこかへ"
 "HAPPINESS"
 "summer FM"
 "LEVEL DEVIL"
 "BE WITH YOU"
 "Winter, again"
 "Will Be King"
 "生きがい"
 "Savile Row ～サヴィル ロウ ３番地～"
 "COLORS"
 "はじまりのうた"
 "愁いのPrisoner"
 "元号"
 "Missing You"
 "SHUTTER SPEEDSのテーマ"
 "彼女の”Modern…”"
 "誘惑"

Blu-ray Disc 2 bonus tracks 
 "ドキュメンタリー映像"
 "あなたといきてゆく" (Music Video）
 "愁いのPrisoner" (Music Video)
 "YOUR SONG" (Music Video)
 "JUST FINE" (Music Video)
 "COLORS" (Music Video)
 "元号" (Music Video)

Blu-ray Disc 3 bonus tracks 
 "GLAY SPECIAL LIVE ROPPONGI HILLS ARENA"（全曲）
 "超プレミアムライブ GLAY × ゴールデンボンバー in 超音楽祭2019"（全曲）
 "GLAY DAY JAPAN PREMIER LIVE in Chitose Powered by HOTEL GLAY" (全曲)

References

External links
 Album profile at Glay's official website

2019 albums
Glay albums